Brad Fuller may refer to:
* Brad Fuller (composer) (1953–2016), American video game composer
 Brad Fuller (producer) (born 1965), American film and television producer
 Brad Fuller (footballer) (born 1978), Australian rules footballer
 Brad Fuller (Neighbours), fictional character on Australian soap opera Neighbours